Thomas Dowd may refer to:
 Tommy Dowd (baseball) (1869–1933), baseball player
 Tommy Dowd (Gaelic footballer) (born 1969), former Meath player
 Tom Dowd (1925–2002), American recording engineer
 Thomas Dowd (bishop) (born 1970), Canadian Catholic bishop
 Tom Dowd (game designer), role-playing game designer